The Yaa Naa is the absolute monarch of the Kingdom of Dagbon, comprising Dagbon; the cultural region occupied by the Dagbamba, and surrounding ethnicities whereby the Kingdom of Dagbon has traditional administrative responsibilities over; including the Konkomba, Bimoba, Chekosi, Basaari, Chamba, Wala, Gurusi and Zantasi. The Kingship is only for descendants of two main chieftancy gates of the Dagbon Kingdom: the Abudu and the Andani. Before a person is eligible to become Yaa Naa, he has to first become a king of either Savelugu or Mion. The Yaa Naa Kingship is patrilineal.

List of the Yaa Naas

References

 
Dagbon royalty
Royal titles